7 Vezes is the seventh album by Brazilian band O Rappa. The title alludes to the fact that this is the seventh album O Rappa has released. It was produced by Ricardo Vidal, Tom Sabóia and O Rappa. It is distributed through Warner Music.

Track listing

Personnel 
 O Rappa
 Marcelo Falcão - lead and background vocals, raggas and acoustic guitar
 Xandão - lead guitar, baritone guitar, 12-string guitar, cavaquinho and bandolin
 Lauro Farias - bass, handclaps
 Marcelo Lobato - drums, marimba, basin, bottle, steel drums, kettle, vibraphone, harmonium, keyboards, bowls, tambura, trombone, melodica, acoustic pipe, metallophone, clogs, tin, can, cranberry, crover, santoor, handclaps

 Additional musicians
 Tom Sabóia - production, guitars, E-Bow, keyboards, orchestration, handclaps
 Cleber Sena - drums, shaker, rattle, creole drum, goat's nail, cajon, EletroPad, water bottle, can, bass drum, reco, caxixi, surdo, tamborica, cuíca, handclaps
 Bernardo Aguiar - rattle, shaker, clogs, agogô, triangle, pans, reco, goat's nail, tambourine, talk drum, caxixi, spring
 Vinícius Falcão and André Rafael - backing vocals
 DJ Negralha - turntables and samples
 Marcos Lobato - keyboards, mandolin, dobro, banjo
 Sérgio Santos and Carlos Medeiros - handclaps
 Alexandre Duayer - guitars, handclaps
 Ricardo Vidal - surdo, caxixi, chimbal, reco and small congo
 Tuca - cuíca
 Nielson - surdo, tambourine and box
 Wesley Assumpção - tambourine, box, peal and surdo

References

O Rappa albums
2008 albums